The Prophecy is a 1995 American fantasy thriller film starring Christopher Walken, Elias Koteas, Virginia Madsen, Eric Stoltz, and Viggo Mortensen. It was written and directed by Gregory Widen in his feature directorial debut, and is the first motion picture of The Prophecy series. It was followed by four sequels. The film tells the story of the Archangel Gabriel (Walken) and his search for an evil soul on Earth, and a police detective (Koteas) who unknowingly becomes caught in the middle of an angelic civil war.

Plot 
Thomas Dagget, a Catholic seminary student, loses his faith when he sees visions of a war between angels. Years later, Thomas is a detective with the Los Angeles Police Department. Two angels fall to Earth: Simon briefly enters Thomas' home and warns him of coming events, while Uziel, a lieutenant of the Archangel Gabriel, is killed in an altercation with Simon. Investigating the disturbance, Thomas finds in Simon's apartment the obituary of recently deceased Korean War veteran Colonel Arnold Hawthorne, and a thesis about angels which Thomas himself wrote in seminary. Meanwhile, in Chimney Rock, Arizona, Simon finds Hawthorne awaiting burial and sucks his soul out of his body.

The medical examiner informs Thomas that Uziel's body has no eyes, hermaphroditism, and the blood chemistry of an aborted fetus. His personal effects include an ancient Bible, with an expanded Book of Revelation that describes a second war in Heaven and prophecy that a "dark soul" will be found on Earth and used as a weapon.

Gabriel arrives on Earth. Needing a human helper, Gabriel catches a disappointed Jerry, a suicide, in the moment of his death. Jerry retrieves Uziel's belongings from the police station while Gabriel destroys Uziel's body in the morgue. Finding Hawthorne's obituary, Gabriel and Jerry head for Chimney Rock. Before Gabriel arrives, at the local reservation school Simon hides Hawthorne's soul in a little Native American girl, Mary, who immediately falls ill and is cared for by her teacher, Katherine.

After finding the burnt remains of what was once Uziel's body in the morgue, Thomas hurries to Chimney Rock. When Gabriel realizes Hawthorne's soul is missing, he confronts Simon. Hawthorne's soul will tip the balance to whichever side possesses it, and a win for the rebellious angels would make Heaven like Hell with Earth in its thrall. Gabriel tortures Simon, but he refuses to reveal its location, so Gabriel kills him. Mary shows signs of possession by Hawthorne, recounting an incident from Hawthorne's harrowing war experiences in first-person perspective. Meanwhile, Thomas examines Simon's remains and questions Katherine. In Hawthorne's home, he finds evidence of war crimes. Thomas visits a church to reflect in and is shaken by a verbal confrontation with Gabriel.

At school, Katherine finds Gabriel questioning the children. After he leaves, she rushes to Mary's home and finds Thomas. As Mary's condition worsens, Katherine takes Thomas to an abandoned mine where she had seen Gabriel. They find angelic script and experience together a terrible vision of the angelic war. Returning to Mary, they find Gabriel and Jerry. Thomas kills Jerry, while Katherine distracts Gabriel when her wild gunshot misses him and blows up Mary's trailer home. They take Mary to a Native American site to be exorcised. In a hospital, Gabriel recruits a new unwilling assistant, Rachael, just as she dies of a terminal illness.

Lucifer confronts Katherine and tells her that "other angels" have taken up this war against mankind, and since then, no human souls have been able to enter Heaven. He knows Gabriel plans to use Hawthorne's soul to overthrow the obedient angels. He also knows that if Gabriel wins the war under his influence Heaven will ultimately devolve into another Hell, which Lucifer considers "one Hell too many". Lucifer then appears to Thomas and advises him to use Gabriel's lack of faith against him. When Gabriel arrives and attempts to disrupt the exorcism ritual, Thomas kills Rachael, and he and Katherine fight Gabriel. Gabriel defeats them and moves to kill Katherine.

Lucifer appears, encouraging the Natives to complete the exorcism. Lucifer confronts Gabriel, telling him that his war is based upon arrogance, which is evil, making it Lucifer's territory. Lucifer tells Gabriel he needs to go home and rips out his heart. Simultaneously Mary expels Hawthorne's soul. The "enemy ghost" starts to attack Thomas and Katherine, but a bright light from Heaven appears and destroys it. Lucifer asks Thomas and Katherine to "come home" with him, but they refuse. Lucifer drags Gabriel to Hell. As morning comes, Thomas comments on the nature of faith and what it means to truly be human.

Cast 
 Christopher Walken as Gabriel
 Elias Koteas as Thomas Dagget
 Virginia Madsen as Katherine
 Eric Stoltz as Simon
 Viggo Mortensen as Lucifer
 Amanda Plummer as Rachael
 Moriah Shining Dove Snyder as Mary
 Adam Goldberg as Jerry
 Steve Hytner as Joseph
 J.C. Quinn as Burrows
 Jeff Cadiente as Uziel
 Patrick McAllister as Col. Hawthorne
 Albert Nelson

Reception 
Rotten Tomatoes, a review aggregator, reports that 46% of 24 surveyed critics gave the film a positive review; the average rating is 5.1/10.  The critical consensus reads: "The Prophecy has its moments, but any fantasy thriller starring Christopher Walken as a murderous angel should be a good deal more engaging than this." Eric Hansen of Variety called it "daring and unique on the one hand, but hard to swallow on the other".  Stephen Holden of The New York Times wrote that the film is bad enough to end the recent proliferation of religious thrillers. David Kronke of the Los Angeles Times wrote, "Though Widen proves himself capable enough behind the camera, his script here is simply too loopy for him to render it in any credible fashion." Mick LaSalle of The San Francisco Chronicle wrote, "Yet for all its goofiness, director Widen has made a film with some genuinely creepy moments." Owen Gleiberman of Entertainment Weekly rated it D− and described it as "an occult freakshow so inert it seems to have been pasted together out of stock footage".

It has since gone on to become a cult film.

WatchMojo, an online list aggregator, claims Viggo Mortenson's portrayal of Lucifer in "The Prophecy" as the best in cinema history.

Sequels 
The film spawned four direct-to-video sequels: The Prophecy II (1998), The Ascent (2000), Uprising (2005) and Forsaken (2005).

Soundtrack 
The film score by David C. Williams was released on Perseverance Records August 7, 2006. The song "Breakin' Down" by heavy metal band Skid Row plays over the closing credits. Other pop songs featured include Angel In Black by Shawn Amos, Surf N' Turf by Dennis Michael Tenney, and Your Best Friend by Peter Bear. The film also uses classical pieces associated with Christianity such as Franz Schubert's Ave María and the Gregorian chant Gloria, laus et honor performed by The Choir Of Monks Of Saint-Benoit Du Lac

See also
 List of films about angels

References

External links 

 
 
 
 

The Prophecy (film series)
1995 horror films
1995 films
1995 fantasy films
1990s mystery films
1990s thriller films
Religious horror films
Religious thriller films
Religious fantasy films
Religious mystery films
American fantasy films
American supernatural horror films
American mystery films
American thriller films
1990s English-language films
Films about angels
The Devil in film
Dimension Films films
Films set in Arizona
Films directed by Gregory Widen
Films with screenplays by Gregory Widen
1995 directorial debut films
Films produced by Joel Soisson
1990s American films